Lieutenant General Sir Charles George Arbuthnot  (19 May 1824 – 14 April 1899) was a British Army officer. He served in the Royal Artillery in the Crimean War and rose to become a senior officer in British India.

Early life
Arbuthnot was born on 19 May 1824 and was a twin, the son of Alexander Arbuthnot, Bishop of Killaloe. His older brother, Alexander John Arbuthnot, became a senior civil servant in India. His half-brother, George Bingham Arbuthnot, was an honorary major general and Colonel of the Madras Light Cavalry in India. He was educated at Rugby and attended the Royal Military Academy, Woolwich.

Military career
Arbuthnot was commissioned as second lieutenant in the Royal Artillery on 17 June 1843. He served in the Crimean War as a captain in the 10th Battalion of the Royal Artillery. He was slightly wounded in minor actions near Sevastopol on 17 June 1855 and received a severe wound on 23 August 1855. He was appointed a Companion of the Order of the Bath (CB), later advanced to become a Knight Commander of the Order of the Bath (KCB) and eventually made Knight Grand Cross of the Order of the Bath (GCB) in May 1894.

Arbuthnot went to India in 1868, and was actively employed in the Anglo-Afghan War. In his personal life, he married Caroline Charlotte Clarke on 27 October 1868. She had been born in Barbados in 1845–6, where her father, William Clarke, was a doctor.

On his return to England in 1880, Arbuthnot was appointed deputy adjutant-general of artillery, then inspector-general of artillery, and finally president of the ordinance committee. According to his article in the Dictionary of National Biography "his firmness and justice made him a highly respected administrator"

Arbuthnot returned to India in 1886, to serve from February as Commander-in-Chief of the Bombay Army and then from December as Commander-in-Chief of the Madras Army. He served as senior military adviser for the Madras Presidency until 1890. He was appointed Colonel Commandant, Royal Artillery in 1893.

Later life
Arbuthnot died on 14 April 1899, survived by his wife and children. One son, Alexander George Arbuthnot (died 3 May 1961), served with the Field Artillery, rising to the rank of brigadier general. A grandson, Charles Crombie, was a decorated flying ace of the Second World War.

References

Sources
 London Gazette (2 November 1855), (4 May 1880), (2 Sept 1887) as cited in DNB
 J. R. J. Jocelyn, History of the Royal Artillery (1911) as cited in DNB
 The Times (18 April 1899) as cited in DNB
 Mrs P S-M Arbuthnot Memories of the Arbuthnots (1920). George Allen & Unwin Ltd.

External links

 

|-
 

1824 births
1899 deaths
Military personnel from County Clare
Charles George Arbuthnot
British Army lieutenant generals
British Army personnel of the Crimean War
British military personnel of the Second Anglo-Afghan War
British military personnel of the Third Anglo-Burmese War
Commanders-in-chief of Madras
Knights Grand Cross of the Order of the Bath
People educated at Rugby School
Royal Artillery officers
People from County Clare